Monognathus ahlstromi, the paddletail onejaw, is an ocean-dwelling eel found in the North Pacific Ocean off of the coast of the United States. It is found up to a depth of 2,000 m. It does not provide parental care. Little information is currently known about its habits or full distribution.

Description
The dorsal and anal fins of Monognathus ahlstromi lack bony supports.

References

Further reading
 GBIF.org
 Catalogue of Life
 Aquatab.net
 Raju, N. S. (1974). Three new species of the genus Monognathus and the leptocephali of the order Saccopharyngiformes. United States National Marine Fisheries Service Fishery Bulletin v. 72 (no. 2): 547–562.
 Bogutskaya, N.G. (2007). Preliminary assignment of coordinates to type localities in the Catalog of Fishes.
 Eschmeyer, W.N., E.S. Herald and H. Hammann (1983).  A field guide to Pacific coast fishes of North America.
 Hubbs, C.L., W.I. Follett and L.J. Dempster (1979).  List of the fishes of California.
 Bertelsen, E. and J.G. Nielsen (1987).  The deep sea eel family Monognathidae (Pisces, Anguilliformes).
 Hanel, L. and J. Novák (2001). Ceské názvy živocichu V. Ryby a rybovití obratlovci (Pisces) II., nozdratí (Sarcopterygii), paprskoploutví (Actinopterygii) [chrupavcití (Chondrostei), kostnatí (Neopterygii): kostlíni (Semionotiformes) – bezostní (Clupeiformes)]

Monognathidae
Fish described in 1974